Common Weal is a Scottish pro-independence think tank and advocacy group which campaigns for social and economic equality in Scotland. It launched in 2013 and regularly publishes papers and works exploring an alternate economic and social model for Scotland. The organisation is not affiliated to any political party and is funded by individual, small monthly donations.

History
Common Weal launched May 2013 as part of the Jimmy Reid Foundation. A group of academics and economists proposed a model based on co-operation and mutual benefit, attempting to avoid social exclusion. The following month, further work from the project cautioned against proposals of monetary union between an independent Scotland and the rest of the UK. In July 2013, founder Robin McAlpine was invited to present the project's economic concepts to the First Minister and the SNP's 65 MSPs. A few months later a conference of SNP councillors showed some support for the ideas around fairness within society. The concepts had also been scheduled for discussion at conferences organised by Radical Independence Campaign and the Scottish Green Party. By the end of the year they had a new website and a distinctive look.

On 1 June 2014, Common Weal launched a 180-page book that drew upon policies from Germany and Scandinavia. This explored an economy with the features of highly skilled workforce receiving high wages within a 30-hour working week.

Common Weal had developed its own identity and in October 2014 it split from the Jimmy Reid Foundation and became an independent organisation under the leadership of Robin McAlpine.

In October 2015 they published a book, 101 ideas to transform Scotland.

In October 2016, they ran an event in Glasgow that coincided with the Scottish National Party conference. This unofficial fringe event included around 40 organisations and was intended as a place for less mainstream ideas to be discussed.

Between 2017 and 2020, Common Weal published more than 100 policy papers, all of which are available on the Common Weal website.

In January 2021, Robin McAlpine changed role to head up strategic development for the organisation and the board appointed Amanda Burgauer as Interim Director to lead a program of organisational change. Amanda was appointed as Executive Director in a permanent role in December 2021.

Research
Common Weal has research in many sectors of policy, with a focus on how the state can put all of us first when developing social, economic and environmental policy:

Fiscal and monetary policy
An Investment-Led Economic Development Framework for an Independent Scotland
Paying Our Way: The Case for a Scottish Payment System
Disruptive Technologies
Scotland's Fiscal Future
Scotland's Monetary Future
A Silver Chain - A Critique of the Sustainable Growth Commission's Monetary Policy Recommendations
Public Private Partnerships: A formula for excess profits and failure
A Scottish Tax System: Imagining the Future
Scotland’s National Bank – Central Banking in an independent Scotland
Backing Scotland’s Currency – Foreign Exchange Reserves for an Independent Scotland
Public Procurement in Scotland: The case for scrutiny, accountability and transparency
Mapping Economic Potential in North-East Glasgow
Air Departure Tax: A Post-Brexit Analysis
Building Scotland’s future now: A new approach to financing public investment

Social and public policy
The Rent Controls Scotland Needs
Back to Life: Mapping Scotland's Alternative to Grouse Moors
Back to Life: Visions for Alternative Futures for Scotland's Grouse Moors
Data Protection and Democracy
Incentives and Opportunities Signalled by Transmission Charges in Scotland
Scotland’s Data Desert: The case for a Scottish Statistics Agency
A Scottish Approach to immigration post-Brexit
Towards a Defence & Security strategy for an independent Scotland
A Public Future for Scotland’s Railways
Alienating, insecure and unaffordable: Living in Scotland’s private rented sector
Social Security for All of Us: An independent Scotland as a modern welfare state
Scottish Space Agency – A discussion on Scotland’s place in the space industry
Fighting for Tax Jobs, Fighting For Justice: A Workers’ Alternative
Divest¦Reinvest: Scottish Council Pensions for a future worth living in

Constitutional policy
Development Councils: A Proposal for a New System of Local Democracy in Scotland
Our Democracy is Not for Sale
The Demographics of Independence - 2018 edition
Foundations for Freedom: A discussion paper on the process for establishing an independent Scotland's Constitution
Preparing Scotland digitally for independence
An Unequal Kingdom: The Barriers to Federalism in the UK
A Citizens’ Assembly for the Scottish Parliament

Environmental and energy policy
The Future of Low Carbon Heat for Off-Gas Buildings
Carbon-free, Poverty-free
Just Warmth
Powering Our Ambitions
Energy Performance Certificates: An Alternative Approach

Publications
Scotland: An Atlas of Opportunity
How to Start a New Country
How to Start a New Country: A Short Guide
A Book of Idea
Determination: How Scotland can becomes Independent by 2021
Objectors & Resisters
Righting Welfare Wrongs: Dispatches and Analysis from the Front Line of the Fight Against Austerity
Butterfly Rammy - The Art of Scotland's Political Awakening
Common Weal - Practical Idealism for Scotland

Board
Common Weal is a company limited by guarantee. At the AGM on 21 March 2022 the members elected the following Directors:
 Allison Graham
 Catriona MacDonald
 Frances Guy
 Iain Black
 Isobel Lindsay
 Dr Keith Baker
 Malcolm Fraser
 Robin McAlpine
 Ruth Watson
 Tommy Sheppard

Funding
Common Weal is funded through subscriptions, individual donations and through selling published works.

References

External links 
 

Political and economic think tanks based in the United Kingdom
Think tanks based in Scotland
Think tanks established in 2013